The Bolshiye Peshnye Islands (Ostrova Bol'shiye Peshnye) is a group of two small islands in the Caspian Sea. It is located 7 km off the coast, 15 km SSE of Peshnoy. 

The Bolshiye Peshnye Islands are 2.5 km away from each other. The northern island has a length of 2 km and a maximum width of 0.7 km. The crescent-shaped southern island is 3.2 km long and only 400 m wide on average. 

Administratively the Bolshiye Peshnye Islands belong to Atyrau Region of Kazakhstan.

References

External links
Caspian Sea Biodiversity Project

Islands of the Caspian Sea
Islands of Kazakhstan
Atyrau Region